{{DISPLAYTITLE:C18H10O9}}
The molecular formula C18H10O9 (molar mass: 370.27 g/mol, exact mass: 370.0325 u) may refer to:

 Eckstolonol
 Variegatorubin

Molecular formulas